Lembah Pantai may refer to:
Lembah Pantai
Lembah Pantai (federal constituency), represented in the Dewan Rakyat